The 2017 European U23 Judo Championships is an edition of the European U23 Judo Championships, organised by the European Judo Union. It was held in Morača Sports Center, Podgorica, Montenegro from 10–12 November 2017.

Medal overview

Men

Women

Medal table

Participating nations
There is a total of 301 participants from 40 nations.

References

External links
 Results
 

European U23 Judo Championships
 U23
Judo, European Championships
European Championships, U23
Judo, 2017 European Championships
International sports competitions hosted by Montenegro
Judo, European Championships U23